Diary of a High School Bride is a 1959 film directed by Burt Topper about a 17-year-old high school student who gets married. American International Pictures released the film as a double feature with Ghost of Dragstrip Hollow.

Plot
A 17-year-old high-school senior must justify her wedding to a 24-year-old law student to both her parents and her unbalanced ex-boyfriend.

Production
The lead actor, Anita Sands, had never acted before. The film was shot over seven days.

Leftover sets for the film were used by Roger Corman to shoot A Bucket of Blood (1959).

Reception
Contemporary reviews were poor.

See also
 List of American films of 1959

References

External links

1959 films
American black-and-white films
American International Pictures films
1959 drama films
American drama films
Films directed by Burt Topper
Films produced by Burt Topper
Films scored by Ronald Stein
1950s English-language films
1950s American films